The Worlds of Fritz Leiber is a collection of stories by Fritz Leiber published in 1976.

Contents
The Worlds of Fritz Leiber is a collection of twenty-two short stories, including "Catch That Zeppelin!".

Reception
C. Ben Ostrander reviewed The Worlds of Fritz Leiber in The Space Gamer No. 8. Ostrander commented that Leiber "is a total master of the written word [...] Don't miss this book!"

Reviews
Review by Michael Bishop (1977) in Delap's F & SF Review, April 1977

References

Short story collections by Fritz Leiber